Events from the year 1801 in Germany.

Incumbents

Holy Roman Empire 
 Francis II (5 July 17926 August 1806)

Important Electors
 Bavaria Maximilian I (16 February 17996 August 1806)
 Saxony Frederick Augustus I (17 December 176320 December 1806)

Kingdoms 
 Kingdom of Prussia
 Monarch – Frederick William III of Prussia (16 November 17977 June 1840)

Grand Duchies 
 Grand Duke of Mecklenburg-Schwerin
 Frederick Francis I (24 April 17851 February 1837)
 Grand Duke of Mecklenburg-Strelitz
 Charles II (2 June 17946 November 1816)
 Grand Duke of Oldenburg
 Wilhelm (6 July 17852 July 1823) Due to mental illness, Wilhelm was duke in name only, with his cousin Peter, Prince-Bishop of Lübeck, acting as regent throughout his entire reign.
 Peter I (2 July 182321 May 1829)
 Grand Duke of Saxe-Weimar
 Karl August  (1758–1809) Raised to grand duchy in 1809

Principalities 
 Schaumburg-Lippe
 George William (13 February 17871860)
 Schwarzburg-Rudolstadt
 Louis Frederick II (13 April 179328 April 1807)
 Schwarzburg-Sondershausen
 Günther Friedrich Karl I (14 October 179419 August 1835)
 Principality of Reuss-Greiz
 Heinrich XIII (28 June 180029 January 1817)
 Waldeck and Pyrmont
 Friedrich Karl August  (29 August 176324 September 1812)

Duchies 
 Duke of Anhalt-Dessau
 Leopold III (16 December 17519 August 1817)
 Duke of Saxe-Altenburg
 Duke of Saxe-Hildburghausen (1780–1826)  - Frederick
 Duke of Saxe-Coburg-Saalfeld
 Francis (8 September 18009 December 1806)
 Duke of Saxe-Meiningen
 Georg I (1782–1803)
 Duke of Schleswig-Holstein-Sonderburg-Beck
 Frederick Charles Louis (24 February 177525 March 1816)
 Duke of Württemberg
 Frederick I (22 December 179730 October 1816)

Other
 Landgrave of Hesse-Darmstadt
 Louis I (6 April 179014 August 1806)

Events 
9 February – The Treaty of Lunéville ends the War of the Second Coalition between France and Austria.  Under the terms of the treaty, Aachen is officially annexed by France.

Date unknown 
 Ultraviolet radiation is discovered by Johann Wilhelm Ritter.
 The magnum opus Disquisitiones Arithmeticae of Carl Friedrich Gauss is published.

Births 

22 January – Friedrich Gerke, German pioneer of telegraphy (died 1888)
19 April – Gustav Fechner, German psychologist (died 1887)
16 June – Julius Plücker, German mathematician, physicist (died 1868)
14 July – Johannes Peter Müller, German physiologist, comparative anatomist, ichthyologist, and herpetologist (died 1858)
10 August – Christian Hermann Weisse, German Protestant religious philosopher (died 1866)
3 September – Christian Erich Hermann von Meyer, German palaeontologist (died 1869)
12 October – Carl August von Steinheil, German engineer, astronomer (died 1870)
23 October – Albert Lortzing, German composer (died 1851)
3 November – Karl Baedeker, German guidebook publisher (died 1859)
13 November – Queen Elisabeth Ludovika of Bavaria, queen of Prussia (died 1873)
24 November – Ludwig Bechstein, German writer and collector of folk tales (died 1860)
4 December – Karl Ludwig Michelet, German philosopher (died 1893)
11 December – Christian Dietrich Grabbe, German writer (died 1836)

Date unknown 
 Thierry Hermès, German-born French businessman, founder of Hermès (died 1878)

Deaths 
14 March – Christian Friedrich Penzel, German musician and composer (born 1737)
25 March – Novalis, German poet (born 1772)
26 April – Karl Heinrich Heydenreich, German philosopher (born 1764)
14 May – Johann Ernst Altenburg, German composer, organist and trumpeter (born 1734)
19 September – Johann Gottfried Koehler, German astronomer (born 1745)
23 October – Johann Gottlieb Naumann, Kapellmeister, conductor and composer (born 1741)

References 

Years of the 19th century in Germany
 
Germany
Germany